Krzemienica  is a village in the administrative district of Gmina Czerniewice, within Tomaszów Mazowiecki County, Łódź Voivodeship, in central Poland.

The village has an approximate population of 210.

Gallery

References

Villages in Tomaszów Mazowiecki County